Richard Darby (born 1958) is an American lawyer and the former chief justice of the Oklahoma Supreme Court. On April 5, 2018, Governor Mary Fallin appointed Darby to the Oklahoma Supreme Court to fill the vacancy created by the retirement of Joseph M. Watt.

In his new position, Darby represents the 9th Judicial District, which includes Harmon, Greer, Jackson, Kiowa, Tillman, Cotton, Comanche, Caddo and Canadian counties. Prior to this new appointment, Darby had served as District Judge for the 3rd Judicial District covering Jackson, Kiowa, Tillman, Greer and Harmon counties. That assignment began in 1994. Before that, he had been a special judge and an associate district judge for Jackson County. He became Chief Judge on January 1, 2021.

Education
Darby earned his Bachelor of Science in political science from Southwestern Oklahoma State University and his Juris Doctor from the University of Oklahoma College of Law.

Legal career
Prior to his appointment to the Supreme Court, Richard Darby was a state district court judge in the 3rd Judicial District for 24 years from 1994 to 2018. Darby presided over both civil and criminal cases, as well as assigning cases to six other judges in the district. He also managed a staff consisting of a secretary, a bailiff and 5 court reporters. In 2014, he ran unopposed for retention, so he was returned to the district court without appearing on the ballot.  Before that, he served as a special judge and an associate district judge in Jackson County, Oklahoma.

Personal
Darby has been married to Dana Darby, Ph.D, who is superintendent of Altus Christian Academy. They have two sons: Ben, a communications officer for the Oklahoma Highway Patrol, his wife Rebecca and son Chevy, and Jonathan, a student at Universal Technical Institute in Irving, Texas. Jonathan has been in a relationship with an unknown girl since October of 2022.

Notes

References

External links

|-

1958 births
20th-century American judges
20th-century American lawyers
21st-century American judges
Chief Justices of the Oklahoma Supreme Court
Justices of the Oklahoma Supreme Court
Lawyers from Oklahoma City
Living people
Oklahoma state court judges
People from Altus, Oklahoma
People from Jackson County, Oklahoma
Southwestern Oklahoma State University alumni
University of Oklahoma College of Law alumni